Your Face Sounds Familiar is a Greek reality show airing on ANT1.

Format 
The first season ran from April 14, 2013 to June 30, 2013 and consisted of twelve live shows where ten celebrity contestants impersonated various Greek and foreign singers. The contestants are evaluated by the show's judges, the audience and the other contestants. The contestant who gathers the highest score in each live (winner of the night), is able to donate the money that is collected from the audience's voting to a charity of their choice. In Cyprus, the money were given to "Mana" (Mother) organization every week.

During the live shows, no one is eliminated at the end of the night. At the end of the semi-final, the four couples with the highest cumulative scores from all eleven lives are the ones who can compete at the final for the first place. The four finalists are scored only by the audience in the final and the contestant who receives the most votes is the winner of the show. Audience is able to vote during the whole week for the winner.

Cast

Host and judges 
The host of the show was Maria Bekatorou and the four judges were Alexandros Rigas, Gerasimos Gennatas, Katerina Gagaki and Bessy Malfa. Dafni Bokota was a guest judge at the fifth live.

Instructors 
The contestants worked with three instructors during the season to help them achieve the best result possible. Vocal coach Victoria Chalkitis, musical performer Sia Koskina and choreographer Maria Lyraraki.

Contestants 
Ten contestants in total competed in the first season; five women and five men:

Performances

Week 1 
The premiere aired on April 14, 2013 and winner of the first live was Thanasis Alevras with 23 points. Mando also got 23 points but she ended up in the second place because her 12 points came from the judges but Alevras' from the audience. Alevras chose to give the money from the audience voting to "To Spiti Tou Ithopiou" (The Actor's House).

Week 2 
The second live of the show aired on April 21, 2013 and the winner of the night was Thanasis Alevras for the second time. Alevras chose to give the money from the audience voting once again to "To Spiti Tou Ithopiou" (The Actor's House).

Week 3 
The third live of the show aired on April 28, 2013 and winner of the night was Kostas Martakis. Martakis chose to give the money from the audience voting to "KETHEA" (Therapy Center for Addicted People).

Week 4: Laïko night 
The fourth live of the show aired on May 5, 2013 and it was dedicated to the Greek Laïko song where all the contestants impersonated great Greek singers who represent laïko. Winner of the night was Konstantinos Kazakos. Kazakos chose to give the money from the audience voting to "Tzeni Karezi Foundation".

Thomai Apergi didn't participate to the fourth live due to illness that doctor recommended not to talk for a while. Apergi received the same points as the contestant who was last during the week, Nikos Ganos.

Week 5: Eurovision night 
The fifth live of the show aired on May 12, 2013 and it was dedicated to Eurovision where all the contestants impersonated past participants of the song contest. Winner of the night was Nikos Ganos. Ganos chose to give the money from the audience voting to "Floga" foundation.

Dafni Bokota was a guest judge for the night and Thomai Apergi didn't participate for second week in a row due to illness. Apergi received the same points as the contestant who was last during the week, Konstantinos Kazakos.

Week 6 
The sixth live of the show aired on May 19, 2013 and winner of the night was Krateros Katsoulis. Katsoulis chose to give the money from the audience voting to "Paidiko Chorio SOS" (Children's Village SOS).

Thomai Apergi returned to the show after two weeks of absence due to illness.

Week 7 
The seventh live of the show aired on May 26, 2013 and winner of the night was Anta Livitsanou with 22 points. Thomai Apergp also got 22 points but he ended up in the second place because she got 10 points from the audience while Livitsanou got 11. Livitsanou chose to give the money from the audience voting to "Koinoniko Mitropolitiko Iatreio tou Ellinikou" (Social Metropolitan Clinic of Hellenic).

Konstantinos Kazakos didn't participate to the seventh live due to illness. Kazakos received the same points as the contestant who was last during the week, Sylvia Delikoura.

Week 8 
The eighth live aired on June 2, 2013 and the winner was Mando with 22 points. Thanasis Alevras also got 22 points but he ended up in the second place because he got 11 points from the audience while Mando got 12. Mando chose to give the money from the audience voting to "Instituto Systimatikis Analisis tis Simperiforas" (Institute of Systemic Analysis of Behavior).

Anta Livitsanou didn't participate to the eighth live due to surgical removal of malignant thyroid nodule. Livitsanou received the same points as the contestant who was last during the week, Crystallia.

Week 9 
The ninth live aired on June 9, 2013 and the winner was Krateros Katsoulis with 23 points. Crystallia also got 23 points but she ended up in the second place because she got 11 points from the audience while Katsoulis got 12. Katsoulis chose to give the money from the audience voting to "Paidiko Chorio SOS" (Children's Village SOS).

Anta Livitsanou didn't participate for second week in a row due to the surgical removal of malignant thyroid nodule she had the previous week. Livitsanou received the same points as the contestant who was last during the week, Konstantinos Kazakos.

Week 10 
The tenth live of the show aired on June 19, 2013 and not on June 16, 2013 as it was scheduled due to the media strike of that day. Winner of the night was Thomai Apergi. Apergi chose to give the money from the audience voting to "Trauma" foundation.

Week 11: Semi-final 
The eleventh live of the show aired on June 23, 2013 and the winner of the night was Thanasis Alevras for the third time on the show. Alevras chose to give the money from the audience voting once again to "To Spiti Tou Ithopiou" (The Actor's House).

Nikos Ganos didn't participate to the eleventh live due acute pharyngitis. Ganos received the same points as the contestant who was last during the week, Thomai Apergi.

At the end of the semi-final, the four finalists who were going to compete for the first place in the final were announced. The four contestants with the highest cumulative scores were Thanasis Alevras, Krateros Katsoulis, Mando and Crystallia and for the first time, they chose themselves which celebrity they wanted to impersonate.

Week 12: Final 
The twelfth and final live aired on June 30, 2013 and the winner of the show was Thanasis Alevras. The income from the audience voting for the final, was divided in ten equal parts and was given to all ten foundations that the contestants were representing during the twelve live shows.

Notes
 1.  The points that judges gave in order (Rigas, Malfa, Gennatas, Gagaki).
 2.  Each contestant gave 5 points to a contestant of their choice.
 3.  Total of both extra and judges' score.
 4.  Result of both extra and judges' score.
 5.  In the final, only the audience voted for the winner and the one with the most votes won the competition.

Results chart 

 indicates the contestant came first that week.
 indicates the contestant came last that week.
 indicates the contestant that didn't compete and took the same points as the last placed contestant of that week.
 performed but didn't score
 indicates the winning contestant.
 indicates the runner-up contestant.
 indicates the third-place contestant.
 indicates the fourth-place contestant.

Ratings

References

External links 
 Official website of Your Face Sounds Familiar
 Facebook page of Your Face Sounds Familiar
 Twitter of Your Face Sounds Familiar

Greek 1
2013 Greek television seasons